Simeon is an unincorporated community in Albemarle County, Virginia.

Morven, Highland, and Sunnyfields are listed on the National Register of Historic Places.

References

Unincorporated communities in Virginia
Unincorporated communities in Albemarle County, Virginia